Neelu Vaghela (born 15 April 1970) is an Indian actress, dancer and television personality, well known for her work in the Rajasthani cinema. She is also well known for the role of Santosh Rathi aka Bhabho in the soap opera Diya Aur Baati Hum and its sequel Tu Sooraj, Main Saanjh Piyaji on Star Plus. She has her own production house, Aruneel Films, which makes Rajasthani movies.

Early life and career
Neelu Vaghela started her career as a stage artist and was chosen for films. She appeared in Supattar Binani in 1981 at the age of 11 and acted in Bai Chali Sasariya which was remade in Hindi as Saajan Ka Ghar. She has spent her earlier phase of life in Jaipur.

She has also appeared in films like Ramgarh Ri Ramli, Jai Karni Mata, Naini Bai Ro Mayro, Lancha Gujri, Derani Jethani, Ramkudi Ghamkudi, Baisa Ra Jatan Karo, Dadosari Laadli, Veer Tejaji and Bai Chali Sasariye.

Vaghela became a household name after portraying Bhabho on popular Star Plus soap Diya Aur Baati Hum. She then went on to participate in dance reality show Nach Baliye 5 with her husband Arvind Kumar. On 23 March 2013, Vaghela and her husband finished in 3rd place on the fifth season of Nach Baliye.

She is married to Arvind Kumar, and has two children - a boy Kaizer and daughter Vanshika.

Television

Filmography
Ramgarh Ri Ramli
Jai Karni Mata
Naini Bai Ro Mayro as Naini Bai
Baba ji ka tullu
Derani Jethani
Dharambhai(with Naresh Kanodia and Arvindkumar)
Ramkudi Ghamkudi as Ramkudi Ghamkudi
Binani
Baisa Ra Jatan Karo
Dadosari Laadli
Veer Tejaji
Bai Chali Sasariye
Nanad Bhojai
Supattar Binani
Lado Tharo Gaon Bado Pyaro
Binani
jaatni
Baba Ramdev

References

External links

1970 births
Living people
People from Rajasthan
20th-century Indian actresses
21st-century Indian actresses
Indian film actresses
Indian stage actresses
Indian television actresses
Indian soap opera actresses
Actresses in Gujarati cinema
Actresses in Hindi television